is a 2018 Japanese film directed by Ayuko Tsukahara starring Kasumi Arimura.

Cast
 Kasumi Arimura as Kazu Tokita
 Kentarō Itō as Ryosuke Shintani
 Haru as Fumiko Kiyokawa
 Kento Hayashi as Goro Katada
 Motoki Fukami as Nagare Tokita
 Wakana Matsumoto as Kumi Hirai
 Hiroko Yakushimaru as Kayo Takatake
 Yō Yoshida as Yaeko Hirai
 Yutaka Matsushige as Yasunori Fusaki
 Yuriko Ishida as the woman in summer clothes

References

External links
 

Japanese adventure drama films
2018 films
Films directed by Ayuko Tsukahara
Films based on Japanese novels
Films about time travel
2010s Japanese films